Alois Schloder (born 11 August 1947 in Landshut, Germany) is a retired ice hockey player.  He participated at the 1976 Winter Olympics and won a bronze medal. He was disqualified from the 1972 Winter Olympics after failing a doping test. After his innocence was proven a few weeks later, he was allowed to take part in the 1972 Ice Hockey World Championships.

He was inducted into the International Ice Hockey Federation Hall of Fame in 2005.

References

External links
IIHF Hockey Hall of Fame bio

1947 births
Living people
Doping cases in ice hockey
German ice hockey players
German sportspeople in doping cases
Ice hockey players at the 1968 Winter Olympics
Ice hockey players at the 1972 Winter Olympics
Ice hockey players at the 1976 Winter Olympics
IIHF Hall of Fame inductees
Medalists at the 1976 Winter Olympics
Olympic bronze medalists for West Germany
Olympic ice hockey players of West Germany
Olympic medalists in ice hockey
Sportspeople from Landshut